The Best of Natacha Atlas is a compilation album by Belgian singer Natacha Atlas. It was released by Mantra Recordings on 23 May 2005. The album contains previously released and re-recorded material, unreleased remixes, and cover songs.

Track listing 
 "Leysh Nat' Arak" (new version)
 "Mon Amie La Rose"
 "Eye of the Duck"
 "Ezzay"
 "Fakrenha"
 "Mistaneek" (2005 edit)
 "Leysh Nat' Arak" (TJ Rehmi remix)
 "You Only Live Twice"
 "Yalla Chant" (2005 edit)
 "Fun Does Not Exist" (new version)
 "I Put a Spell on You"
 "(It's a Man's Man's) Man's World"
 "Amulet" (2005 edit)
 "Kidda"
 "Leysh Nat' Arak" (2005 dub mix)
 "Le Printemps"
 "Moustahil" (live) (hidden track)

References

External links 
 

2005 greatest hits albums
Natacha Atlas albums
Beggars Banquet Records compilation albums
Electronic compilation albums